Maximilian of Austria may refer to the following members of the Habsburg dynasty:
Maximilian I, Holy Roman Emperor (1459–1519), who obtained the Burgundian lands by marriage
Maximilian II, Holy Roman Emperor (1527–1576), king of Bohemia, king of Hungary, and emperor of the Holy Roman Empire
Maximilian III, Archduke of Austria (1558–1618), fourth son of Emperor Maximilian II and Maria of Spain
Archduke Maximilian Francis of Austria (1756–1801), Archbishop-Elector of Cologne
Emperor Maximilian I of Mexico (1832–1867), member of the Imperial House of Habsburg-Lorraine, emperor of Mexico
Archduke Maximilian Eugen of Austria (1895–1952), son of Archduke Otto Francis of Austria